Eula High School is a public high school located near unincorporated Eula, Texas (USA) and classified as a 1A school by the UIL. It is part of the Eula Independent School District located in western Callahan County. The high school is addressed to Clyde since there is not a post office in Eula and is often referred to locally as Clyde-Eula. In 2015, the school was rated "Met Standard" by the Texas Education Agency.

Athletics
The Eula Pirates compete in the following sports - 

Baseball
Basketball
Cross Country
Golf
Softball
Tennis
Track and Field

State Titles
Boys Basketball 
2011(1A/D1)
Softball 
2006(1A)

References

External links
Eula ISD

Schools in Callahan County, Texas
Public high schools in Texas